Thor Bekeng (born 1905) was a Norwegian politician.  He joined the Nasjonal Samling party in 1935.  Bekeng was appointed county governor in Troms county, Norway, in January 1941.  In April of that year he was given the additional task of running the administration of the neighboring Finnmark county. On 14 June 1941, he was appointed as county governor in Finnmark after the governor Hans Gabrielsen was arrested by the occupation government of Norway. He served as the Nasjonal Samling's governor of Finnmark until 1944.  After the liberation of Finnmark began, Peder Holt was appointed to be the acting governor of Finnmark.

References

1905 births
Year of death missing

County governors of Norway